Bjart Ording (19 May 1898 – 12 October 1975) was a Norwegian horse rider who competed in the 1928 Summer Olympics and in the 1952 Summer Olympics.

In 1928 he and his horse And Over won the silver medal as member of the Norwegian eventing team in the team eventing competition after finishing sixth in the individual eventing. He and his horse Fram I finished eleventh as part of the Swiss jumping team in the team jumping competition after finishing 36th in the individual jumping event.

Twenty-four years later at the 1952 Olympics in Helsinki he finished 29th with his horse Fram II in the individual jumping competition.

External links
profile

1898 births
1975 deaths
Norwegian male equestrians
Event riders
Show jumping riders
Olympic equestrians of Norway
Equestrians at the 1928 Summer Olympics
Equestrians at the 1952 Summer Olympics
Olympic silver medalists for Norway
Olympic medalists in equestrian
Norwegian Army personnel of World War II
Medalists at the 1928 Summer Olympics